Pioneer Rocketplane was an aerospace design and development company intent on developing affordable crewed space flight.  The company is most famous for advocating a horizontal takeoff, turbo-jet and rocket propelled, aerial-refueled, rocket plane concept called the Pathfinder.  The company still exists, but is no longer in operation.  Pioneer's intellectual property is now owned by Rocketplane Limited, Inc., however Rocketplane Limited does not employ any of the principals of Pioneer Rocketplane.

History

The "Black Horse" study
The "Black Horse" study began with a bar napkin at the White Sands Missile Range Officers’ Club on May 12, 1993.  The original concept was developed by then Air Force Captain Mitchell Burnside Clapp, who envisioned an aerial refueled, rocket-powered single-stage to orbit (SSTO) vehicle using jet fuel and hydrogen peroxide.  This concept seemed a natural match for the Air Force's TransAtmospheric Vehicle (TAV) mission and studies began at the USAF Phillips Laboratory. Aerospace engineering legend Burt Rutan and noted aircraft designer Dan Raymer contributed input to the development of the design.

During the winter of 1993–94, the U.S. Air Force's Phillips Laboratory conducted a six-week study with WJ Schafer Associates and Conceptual Research Corporation which developed the Aerial Propellant Transfer (APT) concept further. This concept used existing components, existing tankers, landing gear, and conventional technology as much as possible.

The "Black Colt" study
Another study of a somewhat different APT concept was done at Martin Marietta during January through May 1994, this one of a near-term suborbital X-Plane that could serve as a demonstration vehicle for the APT concept.  The study was led by engineer Robert Zubrin, who wrote about his experiences in his book Entering Space.  Because the vehicle was about half the size of Black Horse, it was called "Black Colt."

This concept used an existing NK-31 RP/O2 rocket engine with two Garrett F-125 turbofans used for takeoff, loiter during aerial propellant transfer, and landing propulsion. Also, rather than push for the very high performance required to achieve true SSTO operation, the Black Colt was a suborbital vehicle, with the 1000-lb payload then being delivered to orbit by means of a Star 48V upper stage.

The private sector
Mitchell Burnside Clapp left the Air Force in 1996. Teaming up with Robert Zubrin and promoter Charles Lauer, he founded Pioneer Rocketplane. To help the new company get started, it allied with Dr. Zubrin's research company, Pioneer Astronautics, in Lakewood, Colorado. General Tony McPeak, now retired from the Air Force, joined the company as chairman of the board. During this time Pioneer Rocketplane refined the concept for the Pathfinder rocketplane. It had to require no new engine developments, which would postpone the first flight by years. It had to be built by subcontractors to avoid the time and expense of building an in-house manufacturing capability. Most importantly, it must be able to support the requirements for the new low earth orbit communications satellites. This led to the switch from hydrogen peroxide to liquid oxygen as the preferred oxidizer, and drove an increase in overall size.

Version 2.0 of the Pathfinder concept was delivered in 1997 by Conceptual Research Corporation.

Rocketplane Limited
In 2001, Rocketplane Limited, Inc. was formed.  Pioneer Rocketplane is a part owner of Rocketplane Limited, but ceased operations as an independent company.  Rocketplane Limited purchased the intellectual property of Pioneer and put in place an all new management and engineering team to push the development of the Rocketplane XP.  In 2006, it acquired Kistler Aerospace.

References

Space tourism
Private spaceflight companies
Space access